Langenargen is a town in the district of Bodensee in Baden-Württemberg in Germany.

Sports 

Langenargen is an ideal venue for sports such as sailing. The town's location on the shores of the Bodensee (Lake Constance) provides smooth waters even when windy. Langenargen is the host city of Match Race Germany, part of the World Match Racing Tour. The event draws the world's best sailing teams to Langenargen in a battle of nerve and skill on the water. The identical supplied boats (Bavaria-35 Match) are raced two at a time in an on the water dogfight which tests the sailors and skippers to the limits of their physical abilities. Points accrued count towards the World Match Racing Tour and a place in the final event, with the overall winner taking the title ISAF World Match Racing Tour Champion. Match racing is an ideal sport for spectators in Langenargen and neighbouring towns, as racing in close proximity to the shore provides excellent heart of the action views for the audience. Match Race Germany through the World Match racing Tour and the associated supporting cultural events have helped raise the international profile of Langenargen as well as providing a boost to the economy and local businesses.

Twin towns — sister cities
Langenargen is twinned with:

  Arbon, Switzerland (1963)
  Höckendorf, Germany (1990)
  Bois-le-Roi, Seine-et-Marne, France (1991)  
  Noli, Italy (2005)

References 

Bodenseekreis